Martin Lundgaard Hansen (born 11 October 1972) is a badminton player from Denmark. He started his career in badminton as a singles player, and competed in the 1993 IBF World Championships. But as the years went by, he made a choice to play doubles. Teamed-up with Lars Paaske, they emerged as the men's doubles champion at the 1999, 2001 Denmark Open, and in 2000, he and Paaske participated at the Olympic Games. The career highlights for Hansen was when he partnered with Jens Eriksen. The duo won the 2004 and 2006 All England Open, won gold at the European Championships, and was at the time a half years as No.1 in the world.

Career

2000 Summer Olympics 
Hansen made his debut at the Olympic Games in 2000 Sydney, competed in the men's doubles event partnered with Lars Paaske. He and Paaske beat the Bulgarian pair Mikhail Popov/Svetoslav Stojanov in the first round, but was defeated by Ricky Subagja/Rexy Mainaky of Indonesia in the second round.

2004 Summer Olympics 
Hansen competed in badminton at the 2004 Summer Olympics in the men's doubles with partner Jens Eriksen. They had a bye in the first round and defeated Howard Bach/Kevin Han of the United States in the second. In the quarterfinals, Hansen and Eriksen beat the second seeded from China Cai Yun/Fu Haifeng 3–15, 15–11, 15–8.  They lost the semifinal to Lee Dong-soo/Yoo Yong-sung of Korea 15–9, 5–15, 3–15 and the bronze medal match against Eng Hian/Flandy Limpele of Indonesia 13–15, 7-15 to finish fourth place.

2008 Summer Olympics 
Hansen again qualified to compete at the Olympic Games for three consecutive times, and was partnered with Jens Eriksen. The duo were defeated in the early stage by the second seeded Cai Yun/Fu Haifeng with the score 12–21, 11–21.

Achievements

World Championships 
Men's doubles

World Cup 
Men's doubles

European Championships 
Men's doubles

European Junior Championships 
Boys' doubles

BWF Superseries 
The BWF Superseries, launched on 14 December 2006 and implemented in 2007, is a series of elite badminton tournaments, sanctioned by Badminton World Federation (BWF). BWF Superseries has two level such as Superseries and Superseries Premier. A season of Superseries features twelve tournaments around the world, which introduced since 2011, with successful players invited to the Superseries Finals held at the year end.

Men's doubles

IBF World Grand Prix 
The World Badminton Grand Prix sanctioned by International Badminton Federation (IBF) since 1983.

Men's doubles

Mixed doubles

IBF International 
Men's singles

Men's doubles

Mixed doubles

References

External links 
 
 Martin Lundgaard's Profile - Badminton.dk

1972 births
Living people
People from Kolding
Danish male badminton players
Badminton players at the 2000 Summer Olympics
Badminton players at the 2004 Summer Olympics
Badminton players at the 2008 Summer Olympics
Olympic badminton players of Denmark
World No. 1 badminton players
Sportspeople from the Region of Southern Denmark